Romolo Bizzotto (16 February 1925 – 27 March 2017) was an Italian professional football player and coach who played as a midfielder. He was born in Cerea, Province of Verona. He represented Italy at the 1948 Summer Olympics.

Honours
Juventus
 Serie A champion: 1949–50, 1951–52.

References

External links
Romolo Bizzotto's obituary 

1925 births
2017 deaths
Sportspeople from the Province of Verona
Italian footballers
Serie A players
Hellas Verona F.C. players
Juventus F.C. players
S.P.A.L. players
Palermo F.C. players
S.S.D. Lucchese 1905 players
Italian football managers
Hellas Verona F.C. managers
Rimini F.C. 1912 managers
A.C. Reggiana 1919 managers
Reggina 1914 managers
Association football midfielders
Olympic footballers of Italy
Footballers at the 1948 Summer Olympics
Footballers from Veneto